Facundo Rodríguez (born 26 February 2000) is an Argentine professional footballer who plays as a centre-back for Guillermo Brown.

Club career
Rodríguez's career began with Godoy Cruz. He was selected for his professional debut on 30 March 2019, with Lucas Bernardi picking him to start a 2–1 victory over Patronato at the Estadio Malvinas Argentinas.

In January 2022, Rodríguez joined Guillermo Brown.

International career
In February 2018, Rodríguez received a call-up for training with the Argentina U19s.

Career statistics
.

References

External links

2000 births
Living people
People from San Martín, Buenos Aires
Argentine footballers
Association football defenders
Argentine Primera División players
Primera Nacional players
Godoy Cruz Antonio Tomba footballers
Club Atlético Temperley footballers
Guillermo Brown de Puerto Madryn footballers
L.D.U. Quito footballers
Sportspeople from Buenos Aires Province